The Australian cricket team in South Africa in 1902–03 played six matches including three Tests. Australia won two of the Tests and one other match, and the other three matches were drawn. The opening Test was the first one between the two sides.

Australia was captained by Joe Darling.  The team was the same one that had toured England in 1902; they made a one-month stopover from their home voyage via the Cape of Good Hope.

Test series summary
Australia won the Test series 2–0 with one match drawn.

Match length: 3 days (excluding Sundays). Balls per over: 6.

First Test

Second Test

Third Test

Tour matches

References

External links
 Australia in South Africa, 1902-03 at Cricinfo
 Australia in South Africa 1902/03 at CricketArchive
 Australia to England 1902 at Test Cricket Tours 
 Wisden Online 1904

Annual reviews
 Wisden Cricketers' Almanack 1904

Further reading
 Bill Frindall, The Wisden Book of Test Cricket 1877-1978, Wisden, 1979
 

1902 in Australian cricket
1902 in South African cricket
International cricket competitions from 1888–89 to 1918
1902
South African cricket seasons from 1888–89 to 1917–18